Edward John Mincher (June 7, 1851 – August 12, 1918) was an American professional baseball player. He is considered a "major leaguer" for parts of two seasons with the Fort Wayne Kekiongas and Washington Nationals.

Previously he was an outfielder for the Maryland club of Baltimore, 1868 to 1870. Maryland was one of the pioneer pro clubs when the National Association first permitted professional members in 1869.

Mincher was born in Baltimore, Maryland and died in Brooklyn, New York at the age of 67.

Sources

Wright, Marshall (2000). The National Association of Base Ball Players, 1857-1870. Jefferson, NC: McFarland & Co. . Pages 199, 250, 304.

Major League Baseball outfielders
Baltimore Marylands (NABBP) players
Fort Wayne Kekiongas players
Washington Nationals (NA) players
Manchester (minor league baseball) players
Baseball players from Baltimore
19th-century baseball players
1851 births
1918 deaths
Burials at Green-Wood Cemetery